Heimweh may refer to:

 A German word roughly equivalent to homesickness
 Heimweh (1927 film), a silent German film
 Heimweh (1937 film), a German film